The 1981 UC Davis Aggies football team represented the University of California, Davis as a member of the Far Western Conference (FWC) during the 1981 NCAA Division II football season. Led by 12th-year head coach Jim Sochor, UC Davis compiled an overall record of 6–4 with a mark of 4–1 in conference play, sharing the FWC title with Cal State Hayward. The Aggies were conference champions for the 11th consecutive season and had a winning record for the 12th straight year. UC Davis' loss to Humboldt State on October 10 broke a streak of 38 consecutive conference victories that started in the 1973 season. The team outscored its opponents 163 to 140 for the season. The Aggies played home games at Toomey Field in Davis, California.

Schedule

References

UC Davis
UC Davis Aggies football seasons
Northern California Athletic Conference football champion seasons
UC Davis Aggies football